Classic Whitney: Live from Washington, D.C., were live concerts by Whitney Houston.

The concerts were held at historic DAR Constitution Hall in Washington D.C. on October 3 and 5, 1997. The second-night concert was broadcast live via HBO, which was her third HBO special. (First was "Welcome Home Heroes with Whitney Houston" in March 1991 and second, "Whitney: The Concert for a New South Africa" in November 1994.) The first-night concert was later broadcast on HBO in late October.

Houston said her one-woman show was especially significant because it was occurring during the 100th anniversary of acclaimed opera singer Marian Anderson's birthday. Houston dedicated her performance to Anderson's memory and her historic attempt to perform in 1939 at Constitution Hall, where she was banned by the Daughters of the American Revolution (DAR). The special was viewed as a debacle within HBO according to the book Tinderbox by James Andrew Miller.

History
Whitney Houston performed more than 20 songs in these concerts, including such hits as "I Will Always Love You", "Exhale (Shoop Shoop)" and "Greatest Love of All".

Set list
 "I Will Always Love You"
 "I Know Him So Well" 
 Dionne Warwick Medley:
 "Walk On By" / "A House Is Not a Home" / "I Say a Little Prayer" / "Alfie"
 Aretha Franklin Medley:
 "Baby I Love You" / "(Sweet Sweet Baby) Since You've Been Gone" / "Ain't No Way"
  Tribute to Sammy Davis Jr.: 
 "Mr. Bojangles" 
 Tribute to United States great men: 
 "Abraham, Martin and John"
 Diana Ross Medley:
 "God Bless the Child" / "Endless Love"  / "Ain't No Mountain High Enough" / "The Boss" / "Missing You"
 Tribute to George Gershwin:
 "I Loves You, Porgy" / "Porgy, I's Your Woman Now" / "Summertime"
 "Exhale (Shoop Shoop)" 
 "I Love the Lord"
 "I Go to the Rock"
 "Greatest Love of All" 
Encore
"Amazing Grace" 
"Step by Step"
"I'm Every Woman"

Personnel

 Marty Callner - Director
 Whitney Houston - Executive Producer
 Marty Callner - Producer
 Bill Brigode - Co-Producer
 Randall Gladstein - Co-Producer
 Laurie Badami - Associate Producer
 Rickey Minor - Associate Producer
 Alan Jacobs - Director of Security for Whitney Houston
 Jeff Thorsen - Line Producer
 Tony Bulluck - Tour Manager
 Jimmy Searl - Road Manager
 Nick Jeen - Production Manager
 Risa Thomas - Script Supervisor
 Sara Fung Niimi - Script Coordinator
 Doug Barry - Technical Supervisor
 Keith Winikoff - Technical Director
 Randall Gladstein - Stage Manager
 Gary Natoli - Stage Manager
 Cheryl Teetzel - Production Coordinator
 Erik Jensen - Production Coordinator
 William Hadley - Production Manager
 Rocky Danielson - Camera Operator
 David Eastwood - Camera Operator
 Tom Geren - Camera Operator
 Robert L Highton - Camera Operator
 Dave Hilmer - Camera Operator
 Lyn Noland - Camera Operator
 Wayne Orr - Camera Operator
 Kenneth A Patterson - Camera Operator
 Bill Philbin - Camera Operator
 David Plakos - Camera Operator
 Manny Rodriguez - Camera Operator
 Scott Johnson - Camera Operator
 Bruce Solberg - Videotape Operator
 Bill Lorenz - Videotape Operator
 Paul Ranieri - Video
 Susan Noll - Video
 Greg Brunton - Lighting
 Sam Drummy - Camera Operator
 Ron Sheldon - Camera Operator
 Rickey Minor - Music Director
 Alan Fitzgerald - Music
 Victor Rodriguez - Music
 Mellios Papaterpou - Music
 Sy Smith - Backup vocalist
 Sharlotte Gibson - Backup vocalist
 Pattie Howard - Backup vocalist 
 Joseph Dorose - Performer
 Whitney Houston - Song Performer
 Victor O Hall - Music
 Joe Wolfe - Music
 Joseph Dorose - Music Performer
 Valjean Leiker - Music
 Dirk Vanoucek - Music Supervisor
 Bruce Ryan - Production Designer
 Kent McFann - Art Director
 Caren Reiser - Executive
 Norm Levin - Consultant
 Carolyn Ensminger - Hair Stylist
 Roxanna Floyd - Makeup
 Ellen White - Wardrobe
 Ellin LaVar - Hair Stylist
 Rose Sellers - Wardrobe
 Michael Murray - Wardrobe
 Jeff Fecteau - Audio
 Debbie Kelman-Fecteau - Audio
 Peter San Filipo - Audio
 Don Worsham - Audio Mixer
 Mark Bradley - Sound
 Michael J White - Sound
 Philip Miranda - Sound
 George Strakis - Audio
 Harry Netti - Audio
 Roy Simmons - Sound
 Ishai Ratz - Sound
 Lisa Gilhausen - Lighting Technician
 Renee Adrienne Smith - Stand-in
 Greg Hoffman - Key Grip
 Vicki Brenner - Gaffer
 Russell Morris - Best Boy
 Irv Gorman - Best Boy
 Donny Arrows - Dolly Grip
 Kurt Schupp - Carpenter
 Wendell Jones - Carpenter
 Elisa Arden - Graphics
 Gordon Vernon - ASL Interpreter
 Scott Wallace - ASL Interpreter

References

Whitney Houston
Concerts in the United States